The Army Ten-Miler is the second largest (after the Philadelphia  Broad Street Run) ten-mile race in the United States. It is held every October in Arlington, Virginia and Washington, D.C., sponsored by the U.S. Army Military District of Washington.

The annual race weekend events also include a youth run, a youth activity fair, and a pre-race pasta dinner.  The race draws a large number of civilian and military running teams. The most recent race was held on Sunday, October 9, 2022.

History

The race started in 1985 by fitness officials connected with the Army Headquarters staff in the Pentagon.  In the early years, it was led by staff assigned to the Pentagon with the logistic support of the Military District of Washington.  Subsequently, the program was reassigned to the Military District, where it is headed by a year-round, full-time professional staff. The race course is USA Track and Field certified and is mostly flat, fast and picturesque.

Notable field sizes

The 2007 race was held on Sunday, October 7, 2007 with 26,000 runners entered, and a record 17,000 finishing the 10 mile route. That record lasted only one year until October 5, 2006, when there were a total of 18,789 finishers. The 2009 race was held on Sunday, October 4, 2009.  There were course records set for both the men and women's race.  Alene Reta, from Ethiopia, captured the men's race in 46:59 and Samia Akbar, from Herndon, Virginia, won the women's race in 55:25.  21,256 runners finished the race, making it the largest ten mile run in the United States.  On the same day, nine-hundred runners from fifteen nations participated in a "shadow" run held on Kandahar Airfield, Afghanistan.

The 2010 race set Army Ten Miler registration records, with 30,000 runner slots being sold in only 35 hours.  21,636 runners finished the race, with Alene Reta, from Ethiopia, defending the men's title in 47:10 and Aziza Abate, from Ellicott City, Maryland, winning the women's race in 55:54. During race week, deployed servicemembers and civilians participated in "shadow" runs at six bases in Afghanistan, five bases in Iraq, and one camp in Djibouti, Africa.

By 2018, the race had grown to 35,000 entrants.

Champions

References

External links
 Army Ten-Miler

10-mile runs
Road running competitions in Washington, D.C.
United States Army physical fitness